Elsternwick railway station is located on the Sandringham line in Victoria, Australia. It serves the south-eastern Melbourne suburb of Elsternwick, and it opened on 19 December 1859.

History

Elsternwick station was originally part of the Melbourne & Hobson's Bay United Railway Company's network. The company and network was taken over by the Government of Victoria in 1878, to become part of Victorian Railways. As with the nearby suburb of Ripponlea, which had been named after the adjacent "Rippon Lea Estate" of Frederick Sargood, Elsternwick had been named after the largest property in the district, Charles Ebden's "Elster".

In the 1880s, Elsternwick also functioned as the western end of the cross-suburban Rosstown Railway, which was built by entrepreneur William Murray Ross, mainly to serve the sugar beet processing mill that he had established, along with an adjoining residential estate, in the locality he called Rosstown, now known as Carnegie. The railway was seldom used and it was officially closed in 1916.

In 1915, an electric tramline between Elsternwick and Point Ormond opened. It closed on 22 October 1960, after which the tram route became part of an extended 246 bus route. In February 1959, a project commenced to eliminate the Glen Huntly Road level crossing, where a tramway also crossed the rail line. A temporary two-track station was provided in a side street parallel with the station, which allowed rail services to continue uninterrupted. In October 1960, the work was completed, which was when the present railway buildings were provided.

In 1992, the station was the first in Melbourne to receive the former Public Transport Corporation's teal, sunflower and white coloured station signage, which has since been replaced with Public Transport Victoria branded blue signage. On 13 November 1995, Elsternwick was upgraded to a Premium Station.

During 2002-2003, the ground-level station car park was closed, with a residential/retail development built on it, as part of a deal under which a developer was given the land with the condition that a multi-storey car park, including a lift, was provided for passengers. In 2004, the station underwent a refurbishment.

Platforms and services

Elsternwick has one island platform with two faces. It is serviced by Metro Trains' Sandringham line services.

Platform 1:
  all stations services to Flinders Street

Platform 2:
  all stations services to Sandringham

Transport links

CDC Melbourne operates two routes via Elsternwick station, under contract to Public Transport Victoria:
 : to Fishermans Bend
 : Elsternwick – Chadstone Shopping Centre

Kinetic Melbourne operates two routes via Elsternwick station, under contract to Public Transport Victoria:
 : to Clifton Hill
 : Brighton Beach station – The Alfred Hospital

Yarra Trams operates one route via Elsternwick Station
 : Melbourne University – Carnegie

Gallery

References

External links

 Victorian Railway Stations gallery
 Melway map at street-directory.com.au

Elsternwick, Victoria
Premium Melbourne railway stations
Railway stations in Australia opened in 1859
Railway stations in Melbourne
Railway stations in the City of Glen Eira